Munch'ŏn is a North Korean city located in Kangwŏn Province.  It lies on the coast of the Sea of Japan and borders Wonsan.

History
During the era of Four Commanderies of Han, the region was known as the Xietoumei prefecture under Lintun Commandery. During the later han period, it was part of the kingdom of Dongye and became part of Goguryeo in the 3rd century. The region was called Maeguru at the time of King Gwanggaeto the Great.
Before 1413, the region was part of Hamgyong province, then known as Munju county, but due to the naming changes that follows the convention of changing regional names that end with ju to end with chon(川) or san(山), it became the county of munchon. Munju was a sinized name of the Korean name 'Mulgol (물골, water valley or town)' where the korean word mul was substituted with mun that sounds similar to the korean. In 1946, the region became part of Kangwon province. In 1972, after numerous subdivision changes, the county was abolished, and was incorporated into nearby counties. The county was once again restored in 1976, where some parts of it was incorporated into the city of Wonsan. In 1991, the county was promoted to a city.

Geography
Munch'ŏn sits on Yŏnghŭng Bay, a bay of the Sea of Japan, on lowland seacoast terrain.  The Masingryŏng Mountain Range is to the southwest.  The Sokko Mountain Range and Ch'ŏllyŏng Mountain Range are also located here, and Kulttuk Peak is the highest mountain in the region.  The main river is the Namch'ŏn River.

Climate
Munch'ŏn has a humid continental climate (Köppen climate classification: Dwa).

Administrative divisions
Munch'ŏn is divided into 16 tong and 14 ri:

Economy

Agriculture and fishery
Fishery, fruit, and livestock are the main industries of the region.  Grain is the main agricultural product. The region is also known for its oysters.

Mining
Munch'ŏn has reserves of zinc, gold, silver, limestone, dolomite, granite and clay.  Anthracite is also produced.

Transportation
Munch'ŏn-si is served by the Kangwŏn Line of the Korean State Railway, with stations at Koam-dong, Okp'yŏng-dong and Munch'ŏn-dong.

References

Further reading
Dormels, Rainer. North Korea's Cities: Industrial facilities, internal structures and typification. Jimoondang, 2014.

External links

  Korea Tourist Map (English, Korean, Japanese, Chinese)
City profile of Munchon 

Cities in Kangwon Province (North Korea)